= Yuanqing High School =

Chinese highschool

Coordinates: 30.324643°N 120.151845°E

Yuanqing High School (simplified Chinese: 杭州市源清中学; traditional Chinese: 杭州市源清中學) is a high school located in Hangzhou, Zhejiang. It was established in 1998, and as of 2016 had a student population of 576.
